Purpuraturris cristata is a species of sea snail, a marine gastropod mollusk in the family Turridae, the turrids.

Description

Distribution
This marine species occurs in the Indo-West Pacific; also off the Philippines and Western Australia.

References

 Powell, A.W.B. 1964. The Family Turridae in the Indo-Pacific. Part 1. The Subfamily Turrinae. Indo-Pacific Mollusca 1: 227-346 
 Vera-Pelaez, J. L., Vega-Luz, R. & Lozano-Francisco, M. C. (2000). Five new species of the genus Turris Roding, 1798 (Gastropoda; Turridae; Turrinae) of the Philippines and one new species of the southern Indo-Pacific. Malakos (Revista de la Asociacióon Malacolóogica Andaluza). Monografia 2, 1-29.
 Kilburn, R.N., Fedosov, A.E., Olivera, B.M. 2012. Revision of the genus Turris Batsch, 1789 (Gastropoda:Conoidea: Turridae) with the description of six new species. Zootaxa 3244: 1-58

External links
 Chase, K., Watkins, M., Safavi-Hemami, H. & Olivera, B. M. (2022). Integrating venom peptide libraries into a phylogenetic and broader biological framework. Frontiers in Molecular Biosciences. 9: 784419

cristata
Gastropods described in 2000